Ivan Vitić (1917–1986) was a Croatian architect important to the development of Architectural Modernism in Yugoslavia.

Life 

Ivan Vitić was born on February 21, 1917, in Šibenik, Austria-Hungary. He graduated from the Faculty of Engineering at the University of Zagreb in 1941. Following his studies, Vitić worked with Alfred Albini at the Department of Architectural Compositions until 1943. From 1945 to 1946, he worked briefly at the Croatian Ministry of Construction.

Vitić established his own architectural practice in 1951.

Ivan Vitić died on December 21, 1986, in Zagreb.

References 

Yugoslav architects
20th-century Croatian architects
People from Šibenik
1917 births
1986 deaths